The 1960–61 DDR-Oberliga season was the 13th season of the DDR-Oberliga, the top level of ice hockey in East Germany. Eight teams participated in the league, and SG Dynamo Weißwasser won the championship.

First round

Group 1

Group 2

Final round

Qualification round

References

External links
East German results 1949-1970

Ger
1960 in East German sport
1961 in East German sport
DDR-Oberliga (ice hockey) seasons
Ober